The Palestinian Campaign for the Academic and Cultural Boycott of Israel (PACBI) was launched in April 2004 by a group of Palestinian academics and intellectuals in Ramallah, in the West Bank. PACBI is part of the Boycott, Divestment and Sanctions (BDS) campaign. The campaign calls for BDS activities against Israel to put international pressure on Israel, in this case against Israeli academic institutions, all of which are said by PACBI to be implicated in the perpetuation of Israeli occupation, in order to achieve BDS goals. The goal of the proposed academic boycotts is to isolate Israel in order to force a change in Israel's policies towards the Palestinians, which proponents argue are discriminatory and oppressive, including oppressing the academic freedom of Palestinians.

One of the founders was Omar Barghouti, who is also a co-founder of the BDS campaign. PACBI is a member of the Palestinian BDS National Committee (BNC).

History

PACBI was launched in Ramallah in April 2004 by a group of Palestinian academics and intellectuals, as part of the international BDS campaign. The Campaign built on a call for an economic, cultural and academic boycott of Israel issued in August 2002 and a statement made by Palestinian academics and intellectuals in the occupied territories and in the Diaspora calling for a boycott of Israeli academic institutions in October 2003. The Campaign was inspired by people who supported the  struggle to abolish apartheid in South Africa through diverse forms of boycott.

In 2005 PACBI worked with the British Committee for the Universities of Palestine (BRICUP) which lobbied the Association of University Teachers (AUT) to adopt an academic boycott of Israeli universities.

Views
PACBI argues that "Israel's colonial oppression of the Palestinian people comprises:"

 denial of its responsibility for the Nakba—in particular the waves of ethnic cleansing and dispossession that created the Palestinian refugee problem—and therefore refusal to accept the inalienable rights of the refugees and displaced stipulated in and protected by international law;
 military occupation and colonization of the West Bank (including East Jerusalem) and Gaza since 1967, in violation of international law and UN resolutions;
 the entrenched system of racial discrimination and segregation against the Palestinian citizens of Israel, which resembles the defunct apartheid system in South Africa to form an Israeli apartheid;

PACBI's supporters believe that a boycott of Israeli academic and cultural institutions will contribute towards the dismantling of "Israel's occupation, colonization and system of apartheid".

Activities
In July 2009, PACBI called for the boycott of a proposed concert in Ramallah by Jewish Canadian singer-songwriter Leonard Cohen who had entertained Israeli troops for three months during the Yom Kippur war and expressed a desire to be drafted. PACBI opposed the concert because it would be held two days after Cohen performed in Israel. The organizer of the event cancelled the concert in Ramallah because it was becoming too politicized.

See also
Boycott, Divestment and Sanctions
Economic and political boycotts of Israel
Academic boycott of Israel
Reactions to Boycott, Divestment and Sanctions

Notes

External links
PACBI Official Website

Boycott, Divestment and Sanctions
Boycotts of Israel
Non-governmental organizations involved in the Israeli–Palestinian conflict